Browns Summit (sometimes called Brown Summit) is a small unincorporated community in Guilford County, North Carolina, United States.

The community remains rural, consisting of wooded areas and a mixture of open meadows and rolling farmland, however, it is a growing and upcoming area due to the proximity to Greensboro, Burlington, and Reidsville as well for a number of other reasons: recognition of the state's plan to complete Interstate 785 near the area; the new housing developments in progress, particularly along the western area near NC Hwy 150 and Yanceyville Road; the Bryan Park Complex, located at the town's Southern boundary (Bryan Park features the BB&T Soccer complex, Lake Townsend Park (adjacent to the eponymous lake), and the Champions Golf Course), as well as the handful of major factories located in the Bryan Park complex close to the Summit Avenue corridor. Once the Greensboro Urban Loop is completed, the southern reaches of Browns Summit will be in proximity to the loop.

History
Jesse Brown acquired the land in the area in 1858 and established a farm. In 1863, the Richmond and Danville Railroad built a line through the area and named it Browns Summit, as Brown's farm rested at the highest point of elevation on the line.

Geography 
Browns Summit is located in northern Guilford County and rests at an altitude of 805 feet above sea level.

References

Works cited 
 

Unincorporated communities in Guilford County, North Carolina
Unincorporated communities in North Carolina
Populated places established in 1858
1858 establishments in North Carolina